Olokun (Yoruba: Olókun) is an orisha spirit in Yoruba religion. Olokun is believed to be the parent of Aje, the orisha of great wealth and of the bottom of the ocean. Olokun is revered as the ruler of all bodies of water and for the authority over other water deities. Olokun is highly praised for their ability to give great wealth, health, and prosperity to their followers. Communities in both West Africa and the African diaspora view Olokun variously as female, male, or androgynous.

West Africa

Water deities are "ubiquitous and vitally important in southern Nigeria"; Olókun worship is especially noted in the cities of the Yoruba and Edo people in southwest Nigeria. In West African areas directly adjacent to the coast, Olokun takes a male form among his worshipers while in the hinterland, Olokun is a female deity.

According to Yoruba traditions about their divine dynasty, Olokun - in her female incarnation - was the senior wife of Emperor Oduduwa. Her rivalry with one of his other wives is said to have led to her manifesting the Atlantic Ocean.

Candomblé
In the Candomblé religion of Brazil, Olokun is venerated as the mother of Yemoja and the owner of the sea. She is recognized in Candomblé terreiros, but not during celebrations. In this respect, Olokun is similar to Odudua and Orunmilá; they held great importance in West Africa but play a minor role in Afro-Brazilian religion. There are no xirê chants dedicated to Olokun as with other orixás. Candomblé initiates recognize the divinity of Olokun but do not hold her as a personal deity. The veneration of Olokun has been revived in the late 20th and early 21st century through visits to Brazil by West African priests.

Olokun is celebrated during the Festival of Yemoja (Festa de Iemanjá).

Santería
Olokun is an orisha in the religion of Santería. Olokun is an androgynous orisha, meaning Olokun is a man and a woman, depending on if it is the Olokun of Ifá or the Olokun of Ocha.

Pataki
According to The Book Of Ifá, Olokun became enraged and rose to the surface. As Olokun did this to drown the humans, the orishas went to Orunmila to ask him what to do. Orunmila told them that Ogun needed to create the longest chain he could possibly create. It was ultimately Obatala who had the responsibility of imprisoning Olokun in her/his domain. Knowing this, Obatala went to Ogun and asked him to make the chain and so he did. Obatala then went down into the ocean and trapped Olokun with it.

See also
Yoruba people
Bini people

References

Yoruba deities
Water deities
Health deities
Abundance deities